Zoltán Fehér (born 12 June 1981) is a Hungarian football defender who plays for Soproni.

Career
Fehér started his career in the well known Ferencvárosi TC soccer team. In 2000, he signed over to Rákospalotai EAC. In June 2002, he transferred to FC Sopron. Three years later Zoltán played for the now dissolved Vasas SC, from which he eventually went back to his early team, the FC Sopron. In January 2008 he signed a contract with the Bulgarian club FC Vihren Sandanski, where he performed quite well. Currently (2013) plays at Szombathelyi Haladás.

References

External links
 HLSZ - Professional Football Players Association Profile 
 Profile at Győri ETO FC website 
 
 

1981 births
Living people
People from Szabadszállás
Hungarian footballers
Hungary youth international footballers
Association football midfielders
Ferencvárosi TC footballers
Budapesti VSC footballers
Rákospalotai EAC footballers
FC Sopron players
Vasas SC players
OFC Vihren Sandanski players
Győri ETO FC players
Szombathelyi Haladás footballers
Nemzeti Bajnokság I players
First Professional Football League (Bulgaria) players
Hungarian expatriate footballers
Expatriate footballers in Bulgaria
Hungarian expatriate sportspeople in Bulgaria
Nemzeti Bajnokság II players
Sportspeople from Bács-Kiskun County